Khichdi is an Indian television comedy series that premiered on 14 April 2018 on StarPlus featuring the same cast as the original series that was first launched in 2002, and which aired for two seasons. The series is the third installment in the Khichdi franchise. The series ended on 17 June 2018 as it did not receive expected ratings.

Cast

Main
 Anang Desai as Tulsidas Parekh (Babuji)
 Rajeev Mehta as Praful Parekh
 Supriya Pathak as Hansa Parekh
 Vandana Pathak as Jayshree Parekh
 JD Majethia as Himanshu Seth

Recurring
 Sameksha as Parminder
 Mishri Majethia as Chakki
 Agastya Kapadia as Jackky
 Balvinder Singh Suri as Parminder Singh
Anuradha Verma as Mrs.Parminder Parminder Singh
Melissa Pais as Mrs. D'Souza
Farhad Shahnawaz as Tony
Bakhtiyaar Irani as Peter
 Arvind Vaidya as Chandrakant Seth
 Falguni Rajani as Saguna
Punit Talreja as Various characters
Vindhya Tiwari as Various characters
 Aatish Kapadia as Jignesh and various characters
Amit Dolawat as Various characters

Guest
Renuka Shahane as Bawaskar Madam
Vinay Rohrra as Lord Indra
Sarita Joshi as Champa Kaki
 Deepak Pareek as Arnab Sardesai
 Umesh Shukla as Painter
 Debina Bonnerjee as Painter
 Rajesh Kumar as Ravana
 Krunal Pandit as Jadugar Vashikaran
 Manoj Goyal as Mr. Jagat Agarwal
 Neelam Pathania as Mrs. Agarwal
Deepshikha Nagpal as Dr. Tilottama Dhakdhaki
Paresh Ganatra as Lawyer
Apara Mehta as Yashoda Mausi

References

External links
 Khichdi Streaming on Hotstar

Hindi comedy shows
StarPlus original programming
Indian comedy television series
Indian television sitcoms
2018 Indian television series debuts
Television series about dysfunctional families
2018 Indian television series endings
Hats Off Productions